The Law is an 1850 book by Frédéric Bastiat.  It was written at Mugron two years after the third French Revolution and a few months before his death of tuberculosis at age 49.  The essay was influenced by John Locke's Second Treatise on Government and in turn influenced Henry Hazlitt's Economics in One Lesson.  It is the work for which Bastiat is most famous, followed by the candlemaker's petition and the parable of the broken window.

Overview
In The Law, Bastiat wrote that "each of us has a natural right – from God – to defend his person, his liberty, and his property."  He described the State as a "substitution of a common force for individual forces" to defend this right.  He contended that The law becomes perverted when it is used to violate the rights of the individual, when it punishes one's right to defend himself against an effort of others to legislatively enact laws which plunder his wealth/property. 

Bastiat asserted that whereas justice has precise limits, philanthropy is limitless and thus government can grow endlessly when that becomes its function.  The resulting statism, he argued, is "based on this triple hypothesis: the total inertness of mankind, the omnipotence of the law, and the infallibility of the legislator."  The relationship between the public and the legislator becomes "like the clay to the potter."  Bastiat stated, "I do not dispute their right to invent social combinations, to advertise them, to advocate them, and to try them upon themselves, at their own expense and risk. But I do dispute their right to impose these plans upon us by law – by force – and to compel us to pay for them with our taxes."

Content
Bastiat argues in the work that a government consists only of the people within or authorizing it, therefore it has no legitimate powers beyond those that people would individually have:

He goes on to describe the rights that those individuals do have, which he recognizes as natural rights, based on natural law. He summarizes these as life, liberty, and private property, explaining that government's only legitimate role is to protect them:

Therefore, government is simply an extension of these specific natural rights to a collective force, and its main purpose is the protection of these rights. Any government that steps beyond this role, acting in ways that an individual would not have the right to act, places itself at war with its own purpose:

Bastiat thus also points out that those who resist plunder, as is their natural right, become targets of the very law that was supposed to protect their rights in the first place. Laws are passed saying that opposing plunder is illegal, with punishments that will accumulate to death, if resisted consistently.

Though living in France, Bastiat wrote this book when slavery was still legal in the United States and was very controversial there, as it was in Europe. In the U.S. at that time, there was a dramatic struggle between the agricultural southern states and the industrialized northern. Globally famous were the two key components of this, with the northern states imposing crippling tariffs that impoverished the South while trying to ban slavery. Bastiat pointedly describes both slavery and tariffs as forms of "legal plunder".

Bastiat goes on to describe other forms of plunder, both legalized by the state and banned. He then concludes that the problem of it must be settled once and for all. He says that there are three ways to do so:

 The few plunder the many.
 Everybody plunders everybody.
 Nobody plunders anyone.

He points out that, given these options, what is obviously the best for society is the last one, with all plunder being ended.

Influence
The Law has been cited by many thinkers from a broad range of ideologies. Ron Paul describes it as one of the main books that influenced him. Ronald Reagan cited it as a deep influence. The Federalist Society includes it on their pre-law reading list. Milton Friedman frequently recommended it as a reference.

Contemporaries mentioned in The Law

 François-Noël Babeuf
 Jacques Nicolas Billaud-Varenne
 Louis Blanc
 Jacques-Bénigne Bossuet
 Étienne Cabet
 Étienne Bonnot de Condillac
 Victor Prosper Considérant
 Charles Dupin
 François Fénelon
 Charles Fourier
 Louis Michel le Peletier de Saint-Fargeau
 Gabriel Bonnot de Mably
 Charles de Secondat, baron de Montesquieu
 Morelly
 Robert Owen
 Pierre-Joseph Proudhon
 Guillaume Thomas François Raynal
 Maximilien Robespierre
 Jean-Jacques Rousseau
 Louis de Saint-Just
 Claude Henri de Rouvroy, comte de Saint-Simon
 Adolphe Thiers

References

External links

 
 

1850 non-fiction books
Books in political philosophy
Classical liberalism
Law and economics